Christopher Isham is an American journalist currently serving as Chief of CBS News' Washington Bureau, a position he has held since July 2007. Isham spent nineteen years with ABC News, beginning as an associate producer in 1978, eventually serving as ABC's Chief of Investigative Projects. In addition to his roles with ABC and CBS, he helped build the website The Blotter with investigative reporter Brian Ross.

Early life 
Chris Isham, the son of Heyward Isham, a Foreign Service Officer and Sheila Burton Eaton, an artist. He was born in Berlin, Germany. He graduated from Yale University in 1976 and began his career in the documentary unit at NBC News. In 1978 he became an associate producer at ABC News.

Career 
In May 1998, Isham organized the first major network interview with Osama bin Laden, and broke other major stories exposing security threats at U.S. airports, CIA interrogation techniques, post-Hurricane Katrina insurance fraud, and secret tapes of Saddam Hussein.

Isham was Chief of Investigative Projects for ABC News in New York from 2001-2007 where he built an investigative unit that has been recognized as one of the most successful of its kind in television news. His unit was responsible for breaking hundreds of new stories and exclusive reports on a range of topics from terrorism to political corruption. At ABC, Isham produced the programming for all ABC broadcasts including, ABC World News Tonight, Nightline, 20/20, Primetime, Good Morning America, ABC News Radio and ABCNews.com. His unit also built an investigative site called the “Blotter” on ABCNews.com that broke many major stories including the Mark Foley story.

Isham was named Vice President and Washington Bureau Chief for CBS News in 2007, where he is responsible for news gathering, personnel, and technical operations for all major CBS News broadcasts.

Isham has been the recipients of numerous major industry awards throughout his career including multiple news Emmys, two Columbia DuPont Awards, a Peabody Award, four National Headliner Awards, two Overseas Press Club Awards, the ABA Gavel Award, the Joan Shorenstein Barone Award and three Edward R. Murrow Awards from the Radio Television News Directors Association (RTNDA) and an Investigative Reporters and Editors Award for online journalism.

References 

Living people
Year of birth missing (living people)
CBS News people
ABC News personalities
Yale University alumni
American male journalists
20th-century American journalists
21st-century American journalists
American television journalists